Bach is a double-ringed impact basin within in the Bach quadrangle of Mercury.  It was named by the IAU in 1976.

Bach is one of 110 peak ring basins on Mercury.

References

Impact craters on Mercury
Crater